Humiphila is a monotypic snout moth genus. It was described by V. O. Becker in 1974, and contains the species Humiphila paleolivacea. It is found in Costa Rica.

References

Chrysauginae
Monotypic moth genera
Moths of Central America
Pyralidae genera